The Second cabinet of Katrín Jakobsdóttir was formed on 28 November 2021, following the 2021 parliamentary election. The cabinet is led by Katrín Jakobsdóttir of the Left-Green Movement, who serves as Prime Minister of Iceland.

The cabinet is a coalition government consisting of the Independence Party, the Left-Green Movement and the Progressive Party. Together they hold 38 of the 63 seats in the Parliament of Iceland and serve as a majority government. In the cabinet, there are twelve ministers, where five are from the Independence Party, three are from the Left-Green Movement and four are from the Progressive Party. After the 2021 parliamentary election, the three parties who were in power, in the last parliamentary session, increased their parliamentary majority.

Cabinet
, the Cabinet is composed as follows:

 |-
 | Minister of the Interior
 |rowspan=2| Jón Gunnarsson
 | 28 November 2021
 | 1 February 2022 
 | 
 | rowspan="2"|Independence
 |-
 | Minister of Justice
 | 1 February 2022 
 | Incumbent
 |-

See also
Government of Iceland
Cabinet of Iceland

References

Icelandic cabinets
2021 in Iceland
Cabinets established in 2021
Jakobsdóttir
2021 establishments in Iceland